Shooting at the 2015 Games of the Small States of Europe was held from 2–4 June 2015.

Medal table

Men

Women

References

External links
Site of the 2015 Games of the Small States of Europe

2015 in shooting sports
2015 Games of the Small States of Europe
Shooting at the Games of the Small States of Europe